Tracer is the second studio album by American electronic music duo Teengirl Fantasy. It was released on R&S Records and True Panther Sounds on August 21, 2012. It features vocal contributions from Kelela, Panda Bear, Laurel Halo, and Romanthony.

Critical reception

At Metacritic, which assigns a weighted average score out of 100 to reviews from mainstream critics, Tracer received an average score of 71, based on 25 reviews, indicating "generally favorable reviews".

Sarah H. Grant of Consequence of Sound gave the album a grade of "B" and commented that "Teengirl Fantasy's interpretation of dance-pop through a technical EDM filter recalls Sonic Youth's re-interpretation of hardcore punk through indie rock." Jayson Greene of Pitchfork gave the album a 7.0 out of 10, saying, "If Tracer has significant replay value, it's for the parsing of the details of its light-filled surface, for the sounds themselves." George Bass of Slant Magazine gave the album 4 out of 5 stars, describing it as "a carefully balanced collage of experimental electronica and stylish vocal pop on which Nick Weiss and Logan Takahashi display a technical prowess to match many of EDM's current stars".

Blurt named it the 27th best album of 2012.

Track listing

Personnel
Credits adapted from liner notes.

 Logan Takahashi – performance, production
 Nick Weiss – performance, production
 Kelela – vocals (2)
 Panda Bear – vocals (4)
 Laurel Halo – vocals (5)
 Romanthony – vocals (9)
 Nathan Boddy – additional mixing (1, 3, 5–8, 10)
 Michael Cheever – additional mixing (2, 4, 9)
 Joe LaPorta – mastering
 Kari Attmann – artwork
 Richard Robinson – design

References

External links
 

2012 albums
R&S Records albums
True Panther Sounds albums
Electronic albums by American artists